Metrosassari, also called Sassari tramway, Sassari tram-train or Sassari metro-tramway ( or ) is the commercial name of a tram-train line in Sassari, Sardinia, Italy, operated by the regional public transport company ARST (Azienda Regionale Sarda Trasporti).

Despite having been built in the early 2000s, in the urban section the line was built with single track and narrow gauge, to connect with the same  gauge used in the secondary railway lines in Sardinia.

Rolling stock
Tram vehicles were designed by Pininfarina and built by AnsaldoBreda "Sirio".

Route
The  tramway part of the line (Stazione - Emiciclo Garibaldi) opened in October 2006, linking the railway station with the city centre via the hospital district.

On 27 September 2009 the line was extended into the peripheral district of Santa Maria di Pisa, running on the electrified portion of the Sassari–Sorso railway.

Projects 
The main part of the network is in 2013 in advanced development phase. Currently is under construction is the extension of the line from Santa Maria di Pisa to Li Punti and Baldinca, and the electrification of the railway to Sorso, 10 km from Sassari.

It is also planned to convert and electrify the 28 km Sassari-Alghero railway to allow the trams to reach the village of Olmedo, Fertilia Airport and the town of Alghero.

References

Bibliography 
 Gian Guido Turchi: A Sassari arriva il tram. In: ″I Treni″ Nr. 224 (March 2001), p. 14–17.

External links 

 Timetable (pdf)

Tram transport in Italy
Railway lines in Sardinia
Sassari
950 mm gauge railways in Italy
Railway lines opened in 2006
750 V DC railway electrification